Kyle McKinstry (born 26 August 1986) is a Northern Irish professional darts player who is currently serving an eight-year ban from the sport after admitting to match fixing in 2020.

Career

In 2017, McKinstry won the Hal Masters and the Northern Ireland Open. He qualified for the 2018 BDO World Darts Championship as number 17 in the BDO rankings, but he lost 3–2 to Richard Veenstra in the first round. The following year, he qualified for the tournament once again, and has beaten Chris Landman 3–2 in the first round, David Cameron 4–3 in the second round and losing to Glen Durrant 5–2 in the Quarter Finals.

In 2020, McKinstry debut of the 2020 UK Open has beaten Fallon Sherrock in the first round, Jason Heaver in the second round, Stephen Burton in the third round, Bradley Brooks in the forth round, Martin Schindler in the fifth round and losing to Dimitri Van den Bergh 10–8 in the Sixth Round. In August 2020, McKinstry and Wessel Nijman were suspended for match-fixing during Modus Live League games. McKinstry was eventually served with an eight-year ban from the sport following the DRA inquiry.

World Championship results

BDO

 2018: 1st round (lost to Richard Veenstra 2–3)
 2019: Quarter-finals (lost to Glen Durrant 2–5)

Performance timeline

External links
 Kyle McKinstry's profile and stats on Darts Database

References

1986 births
Living people
Darts players from Northern Ireland
British Darts Organisation players
Professional Darts Corporation associate players
Match fixers